Jeff Barrett (1913-1970) was a professional American football player who played wide receiver for three seasons for the Brooklyn Dodgers.

References

1913 births
American football wide receivers
Brooklyn Dodgers (NFL) players
LSU Tigers football players
1970 deaths
Shorty Award winners